This article shows the qualification phase for 2018–19 CEV Champions League. A total of 16 teams entered this qualification round. During qualification, the winners of each tie keep on progressing until the last 2 teams standing join the 18 teams which have directly qualified to the main tournament League round based on the European Cups' Ranking List. All 14 teams which do not progress in qualification are allocated to the 2018–19 Men's CEV Cup.

Participating teams
Drawing of lots took place on 29 June 2018 in Luxembourg City, Luxembourg.

First round
 16 teams compete in the first round.
Winner advance to the second round and loser qualify to CEV Cup.
All times are local.

|}

First leg

|}

Second leg

|}

Second round
8 teams compete in the second round.
Winners advance to the third round and losers qualify to CEV Cup.

|}

First leg

|}

Second leg

|}

Third round
4 teams compete in the third round.
Winners advance to the League round and losers qualify to CEV Cup.

|}

First leg

|}

Second leg

|}

References

Qualification
CEV Champions League qualification